Fred Sharaga (September 18, 1909 – March 24, 2004) was an American racewalker. He competed in the men's 10 kilometres walk at the 1948 Summer Olympics. Sharaga was a three-time national champion in walking events in the 1940s, and represented the Young Men's Hebrew Association.

References

External links
 

1909 births
2004 deaths
Athletes (track and field) at the 1948 Summer Olympics
American male racewalkers
Olympic track and field athletes of the United States
Place of birth missing